R v Secretary of State for the Home Department, ex parte Simms [1999] UKHL 33 is a UK constitutional law case, concerning parliamentary sovereignty.

Facts
Simms and another prisoner, both serving life sentences for murder, brought judicial review proceedings against the Home Secretary’s contention that they could not have oral interviews with journalists unless no part would be published. Under the Prison Act 1952 section 47(1) the Home Secretary had passed Prison Service Standing Order 5, paragraph 37-A which restricted oral interviews with journalists. The prisoners contended this impinged upon the right of journalists to free speech under the European Convention on Human Rights article 10, because practically the opportunity for any investigation into their convictions would be inhibited by not allowing them to speak. The prisoners could, however, engage in written correspondence.

Latham J held that the prisoners should be able to do oral interviews. The Court of Appeal held the prisoners could not do oral interviews.

Judgment
The House of Lords allowed the appeal. Lord Steyn gave the leading judgment.

Lord Hoffmann agreed with Lord Steyn and said the following.

Lord Hobhouse gave a concurring opinion. Lord Browne-Wilkinson agreed with Lord Steyn. Lord Millett agreed with Lord Steyn and Lord Hobhouse.

See also

United Kingdom constitutional law
Watkins v Home Office and others

Notes

References

United Kingdom constitutional case law
House of Lords cases
1999 in British law
2000 in British law
1999 in case law
2000 in case law
United Kingdom administrative case law